The Samkos bush frog (Feihyla samkosensis) is a moss frog found in Cambodia in the Cardamom Mountains. It was first described in 2007.

Description
It has a smooth body and translucent skin; its blood is externally visible. It has green-colored blood and turquoise-hued bones, a result of a pigment in waste products, biliverdin.

Distribution
The species is found in the jungle terrain of the Cardamom Mountains in southwestern Cambodia.

Conservation status
F. samkosensis is listed as "vulnerable" by the IUCN. Human expansion threatens the species, notably via a new, wide, graded road through the middle of the type locality.

See also
Prasinohaema

Notes

External links

Images at Wildlife Extra

Feihyla
Endemic fauna of Cambodia
Amphibians of Cambodia
Amphibians described in 2007